PersonA (pronounced "Persona") is the fourth studio album by the band Edward Sharpe and the Magnetic Zeros. It was released on April 15, 2016.

In an in-depth interview with Transverso Media, lead singer Alex Ebert explained his desire to evolve on PersonA, stating, "In a lot of ways this album does things that are missing." He went on to discuss why the name Edward Sharpe is crossed out on the cover, saying, "There was no character to begin with, so why not kill him? He never really was there. If anything, and at most, Edward Sharpe was a vehicle for me to get to slough off whatever I had become up until that point, and to get back to or sort of allow my pure self to come forth into sort of a clean slate."

Track listing

Charts

References

2016 albums
Edward Sharpe and the Magnetic Zeros albums